Slobodan Lalić (Serbian Cyrillic: Слободан Лалић; born 18 February 1992 in Kula) is a Serbian footballer who plays for Hajduk Kula.

Honours
Csíkszereda
Liga III: 2018–19

References

External links
 Slobodan Lalić at Srbijafudbal
 

1992 births
Living people
Serbian footballers
Association football defenders
FK Hajduk Kula players
FK TSC Bačka Topola players
FK Voždovac players
FK Čukarički players
FK Drina Zvornik players
FK ČSK Čelarevo players
FK Inđija players
FK Csíkszereda Miercurea Ciuc players
Serbian First League players
Serbian SuperLiga players
Serbian expatriate footballers
Serbian expatriate sportspeople in Romania
Expatriate footballers in Romania